Casey Childs is the Founder of Primary Stages (www.primarystages.org)],[1] a New York State non-profit, Off-Broadway theater company in New York City. Since 1984 they have produced over 175 productions of new plays, many of them world premieres and all of them New York City premieres, by such writers as Sharon Washington, David Ives, Horton Foote, Charlayne Woodard, Melissa Manchester, Jeffrey Sweet, Donald Margulies, Terrence McNally, A.R. Gurney, John Patrick Shanley, Ike Holter, Tina Howe, Charles Busch, John Henry Redwood, Romulus Linney, Lee Blessing, Michael Cristofer, Mac Wellman, Lynne Alvarez, Willie Holtzman, Athol Fugard, Theresa Rebeck, Michael Hollinger and Julia Jordan. He produced the commercial moves of David Ives’ All in the Timing and Mere Mortals and oversaw the commercial moves of Charles Busch's You Should Be So Lucky and Colin Martin's Virgins and Other Myths. He also oversaw the transfer of Horton Foote's Dividing the Estate, which moved to the Booth Theatre on Broadway in association with Lincoln Center Theater. In 2013 in partnership with the New York Yankees, Primary Stages developed Bronx Bombers which played on Broadway at Circle in the Square. Primary Stages was the first theater to produce Conor McPherson work in the United States with St. Nicholas starring Brian Cox. 
He conceived, commissioned and directed the commercial Off-Broadway show Woman Before a Glass by Lanie Robertson about Peggy Guggenheim with Mercedes Ruehl which ran for seven months at the Promenade Theatre. Other plays he directed for Primary Stages include The Morini Strad by Willie Holtzman, Barefoot Boy With Shoes On by Edwin Sanchez, Bargains by Jack Heifner, Brutality of Fact by Keith Reddin, The Preservation Society by William S. Leavengood, Elsa/Edgar by Bob Kingdom, The Dolphin Position by Percy Granger, Lusting After Pipino's Wife by Sam Henry Kass, The Secret Sits in the Middle by Lisa-Maria Radano, Algerian Romance by Kres Mersky, Madam Zelena Finally Comes Clean by Ron Carlsen, Stopping the Desert by Glen Merzer, In September Woods by David Hill and Nasty Little Secrets by Lanie Robertson. 
Plays produced by Primary Stages have received many nominations and awards from the Obies, the Drama Desk, the Outer Critics Circle and the Audelco Awards for Excellence in Afro-American Theatre. Plays that began at Primary Stages have received multiple nominations for Tony Awards. In 2008, Primary Stages was honored for its Outstanding Body of Work by the Lucille Lortel Awards. Carnegie-Mellon University awarded Casey their Commitment to Playwrights Award in 1995. 
From 1982 until 1985 Casey was the Artistic Programs Director for the New Dramatists, America's oldest playwrights’ organization, where he conducted the workshops for over 75 new playwrights in developing over 300 new works. He oversaw the development of new plays by many new playwrights including August Wilson, Wendy Kesselman, John Ford Noonan, Thomas Keneally, Emily Mann, John Pielmeier, Steve Carter, Oyamo, James Yoshimora and Pedro Juan Pietre. Works developed during that time have received productions on and off Broadway and in many American regional theatres garnering Pulitzer Prizes, Tony Awards and other honors. 

Casey spent four seasons directing staged readings of new plays for the Eugene O’Neill Theater Conference where he worked under Lloyd Richards on scripts by playwrights including Joe DiPietro, Lee Blessing, Catherine Filloux, Joe Pintaro and Deborah Brevoort. Two of the media scripts he developed there, Jacob Aaron Estes' Mean Creek and Eric John Litra's The Nickel Children, went on to become feature films. 
Regionally Casey has directed Sexual Perversity in Chicago (Edinburgh premiere) at the Edinburgh International Festival in Scotland, The Magnificent Cuckold for the Metro Theater Company and the Pittsburgh Museum of Art, and Gym Rats (winner of the Lorraine Hansberry Playwriting Award) which was a staged reading co-produced by New Dramatists and the McDonald's corporation. 
For television he produced A.R. Gurney's “Far East” (directed by Daniel Sullivan) for the Stage on Screen series for WNET/PBS. He has produced and/or directed over 2,000 episodes of network television over thirty years and has worked on such shows as “The Young and the Restless” and “As the World Turns” for CBS, “Hollywood Heights” for Sony Pictures, “Another World” for NBC and “The City,” “Loving,” “One Life to Live,” “All My Children” and segments of “Spin City” for ABC. He was the senior producer for “All My Children” for several years. He has also worked on shows for Turner Broadcasting and Lifetime. He has won two Emmy Awards for his television directing and many nominations for both producing and directing in television. 
A graduate of Carnegie-Mellon University with a BFA in acting and an MFA in directing, Casey has acted and/or directed in the United States and Great Britain with such companies as the Metro Stage Company in Pittsburgh, Philadelphia Festival of New Plays, and Oregon Shakespeare Festival, Edinburgh Festival and the New Dramatists. He acted in over 100 productions and appeared with Shakespeare festivals in New Jersey, Colorado, Texas, and Ashland, Oregon. 
At Primary Stages, he launched the Marvin and Anne Einhorn School of Performing Arts, (ESPA) which is a training institution for playwrights, actors and directors. Primary Stages also teamed with Fordham University to create the Fordham/Primary Stages MFA in Playwriting Program. Casey has taught and/or guest lectured on television and theater at such schools as Yale, Ithaca College, Duke, Carnegie Mellon, Stone Street Studios (New York University), the University of California in San Diego, and the University of Georgia in Athens, Pratt Institute, and the American University in Cairo, Skidmore and the University of South Florida in Tampa. He spent one year on the faculty of the Columbia Film School as an associate professor teaching acting for directors. He made three trips to Russia as a guest of the Federation of Russian Theatre Workers and directed Will Dunn's Hotel Desperado in 1997 as part of an exchange between the O’Neill Theater Conference and the Shelakova Playwrights Festival. 

Casey has served on theater panels for the Pennsylvania State Arts Council and for the Affiliated Artists. He served as a panelist and as a site evaluator for the Pew Charitable Trusts Philadelphia Theater Initiative. He was a governor for two years for the National Academy of Television Arts and Sciences New York Chapter, where he headed the Critical Viewing Committee. He has served on the East Coast Directors’ Council of the Directors Guild of America and was a Vice President of the DGA's National Board for four years. He was the Vice President of the original board for LMDA, the Literary Managers and Dramaturges of America. He is a member of Actors' Equity, Stage Directors and Choreographers Society and the Directors Guild of America. 
In 2020, the Actors Fund documented his life’s work as part of their Performing Arts Legacy Project.

Primary Stages  https://primarystages.org/
Primary Stages Off-Broadway Oral History Project http://primarystagesoffcenter.org/
Actors Fund’s Performing Arts Legacy Project https://performingartslegacy.org/childscasey/

Television awards and nominations

Daytime Emmy Award
Nominated, 2005, Drama Series, All My Children
Nominated, 2005, Directing, All My Children
Won, 2003, Directing, All My Children
Nominated, 2002, Directing, All My Children
Nominated, 2001, Directing, All My Children
Nominated, 2000, Directing, All My Children
Nominated, 1999, Directing, All My Children
Nominated, 1998, Directing, All My Children
Nominated, 1993, Directing, Another World
Win, 1992, Directing, Another World

Directors Guild of America Award
Nomination, 2006, Directing, All My Children Ep. #9297
Nomination, 2000, Directing, All My Children Ep. #7919

References

External links

Soap opera producers
American television directors
American television producers
Year of birth missing (living people)
American soap opera writers
Living people